Héngdù (横渡) may refer to the following locations in China: 

 Hengdu, Shitai County, town in Anhui
 Hengdu, Sanmen County, town in Sanmen County, Zhejiang